Congo in Four Acts is a 2010 documentary film.

Synopsis 
Initiated as an educational project to help young filmmakers develop their craft, Congo in Four Acts is a quartet of short films. "Ladies in Waiting (Dames en attente)" chronicles the bureaucratic dysfunctions of a maternity ward from which women cannot leave unless they pay their fees. "Symphony Kinshasa" takes the viewer on a tour through Congo's capital city where malaria is rife, electricity cables lie in the street and garbage is everywhere. "Zero Tolerance" deals with rape as a weapon of war in Eastern RDC and the attempts by authorities to re-establish the national moral code. "After the Mine" depicts life in Kipushi, a mining town where the soil is contaminated.

Production
The film was co-directed by Dieudo Hamadi, Kiripi Katembo and Divita Wa Lusala.

Awards 
 Cinéma du Réel 2010
 Africa Movie Academy Awards 2011
The Pierre And Yolande Perrault Grant at Cinema Du Reel (“Ladies In Waiting”) 
The Grand Prix - One World Kyrgyzstan International Film Festival 2011

See also
Kinshasa Symphony

References

External links 
 

2010 films
Creative Commons-licensed documentary films
Democratic Republic of the Congo documentary films
South African documentary films
2010 documentary films
Anthology films
Documentary films about African politics